Lloyd's Register Group Limited (LR) is a technical and professional services organisation and a maritime classification society, wholly owned by the Lloyd’s Register Foundation, a UK charity dedicated to research and education in science and engineering. The organisation dates to 1760. Its stated aims are to enhance the safety of life, property, and the environment, by helping its clients (including by validation, certification, and accreditation) to improve the safety and performance of complex projects, supply chains and critical infrastructure.

In July 2012, the organisation converted from an industrial and provident society to a company limited by shares, named Lloyd’s Register Group Limited, with the new Lloyd’s Register Foundation as the sole shareholder. At the same time the organisation gave to the Foundation a substantial bond and equity portfolio to assist it with its charitable purposes. It will benefit from continued funding from the group’s operating arm, Lloyd’s Register Group Limited.

In 2020, Lloyd's Register sold its Energy business and in 2021 sold its Business Assurance & Inspection Services division. In 2022, LR acquired OneOcean Group, a marine software and digital services company, to head up a new digital services division.

Lloyd's Register is unaffiliated with Lloyd's of London, but emerged from the same professional and social circles that historically met at Lloyd's Coffee House, from which both organisations took their name.

Origin
The organisation was named after a 17th-century coffee house in London that was frequented by merchants, marine underwriters, and others, all men associated with shipping.  The coffee house owner, Edward Lloyd, helped them to exchange information by circulating a printed sheet of all the news he heard. In 1760, the Register Society was formed by the customers of the coffee house who assembled the Register of Shipping, the first known register of its type. Between 1800 and 1833, a dispute between shipowners and underwriters resulted in each group publishing a list—the "Red Book" and the "Green Book". Both parties came to the verge of bankruptcy. They reached agreement in 1834 to unite and form Lloyd’s Register of British and Foreign Shipping, establishing a General Committee and charitable values. In 1914, with an increasingly international outlook, the organisation changed its name to Lloyd's Register of Shipping.

The Register
The Society printed the first Register of Ships in 1764 in order to give both underwriters and merchants an idea of the condition of the vessels they insured and chartered: ship hulls were graded by a lettered scale (A being the best), and ship's fittings (masts, rigging, and other equipment) were graded by number (1 being the best). Thus the best classification "A1", from which the expression A1 or A1 at Lloyd's is derived, first appeared in the 1775–76 edition of the Register.

The Register, with information on all seagoing, self-propelled merchant ships of 100 gross tons or greater, is published annually. A vessel remains registered with Lloyd's Register until she is sunk, wrecked, hulked, scrapped or withdrawn from the register by the vessel's owner.

The Register was published formerly by the joint venture company of Lloyd's Register-Fairplay, which was formed in July 2001 by the merger of Lloyd's Register's Maritime Information Publishing Group and Prime Publications Limited. Lloyd's Register sold its share of the venture to IHS Markit in 2009.

American Lloyd’s Register of American and Foreign Shipping

The American Lloyd’s Registry of American and Foreign Shipping was established in 1857, and the American Lloyd’s Register of American and Foreign Shipping issued from at least 1859 until at least 1883 by the "Board of American Lloyd's".

Classification rules

Lloyd's Register is known best for the classification and certification of ships and inspects and approves important components and accessories, including life-saving appliances, marine pollution prevention, fire protection, navigation, radio communication equipment, deck gear, cables, ropes, and anchors.

LR's Rules for Ships

LR's Rules for Ships are derived from principles of naval architecture and marine engineering, and govern safety and operational standards for numerous merchant, military, and privately owned vessels. LR's Rules govern a number of topics including:
 Materials used for construction of the vessel
 Ship structural requirements and minimum scantlings, depending on ship type
 Operation and maintenance of main and auxiliary machinery
 Operation and maintenance of emergency and control systems

Specific editions of the rules are available to cater for merchant ships, naval ships, trimarans, special purpose vessels and offshore structures. A ship is known as being in class if she meets all the minimum requirements of LR's Rules, and such a status affects the possibility of a ship getting insurance. Class can be withdrawn from a ship if she is in violation of any regulations and does not maintain the minimum requirements specified by the company. However, exceptional circumstances may warrant special dispensation from Lloyd's Register. Any alteration to the vessel, whether it is a structural alteration or machinery, must be approved by Lloyd's Register before it is implemented.

Ships are inspected on a regular basis by a team of Lloyd's Register surveyors, one of the most important inspections being a ship's load line survey – due once every five years. Such a survey includes an inspection of the hull to make sure that the load line has not been altered. Numerous other inspections such as the condition of hatch and door seals, safety barriers, and guard rails are also performed. Upon completion the ship is allowed to be operated for another year, and is issued a load line certificate.

Rules and regulations 
Lloyd’s Register provide a list of rules and regulations to the public.

List of regulations
 The Rules and Regulations for the Classification of Ships
 The Rules and Regulations For The Classification Of Special Service Craft
 The Rules and Regulations for the Classification of Naval Ships
 The Rules for the Manufacture, Testing and Certification of Materials
 Rules for Offshore Units
 The Rules for the Classification of Trimarans
 The Rules and Regulations for the Construction and Classification of Floating Docks
 The Rules and Regulations for the Classification of Natural Gas Fuelled Ships
 Rules and Regulations for the Classification of Linkspans
 Rules and Regulations for the Classification of     Inland Waterways Ships
 Rules and Regulations for the Classification of Ships     for Service on the Great Lakes and River St. Lawrence
 Rules and Regulations for the Construction and     Classification of Ships for the Carriage of Liquefied Gases in Bulk
 Rules and Regulations for the Construction and     Classification of Ships for the Carriage of Liquid Chemicals in Bulk
 Rules and Regulations for the Classification of Ships     using Gases or other Low-flashpoint Fuels
 Rules and Regulations for the Construction and     Classification of Submersibles and Underwater Diving Systems
 Code for Lifting Appliances in a Marine Environment
 Code for Offshore Personnel Transfer Systems
 Rules for the Classification of Trimarans
 Rules for Air Cushion Vehicles
 Rules for Ergonomic Container Lashing
 Rules for LNG Ships and Barges Equipped with     Regasification Systems
 Rules for the Classification of Potable Water     Carriers
 Rules for Sail-Assisted Ships
 Rules for the Application of Sandwich Panel     Construction to Ship Structure
 Rules for the Classification of Stern First Ice Class     Ships
 Rules for the Winterisation of Ships
 Common Structural Rules for Bulk Carriers and Oil     Tankers
 Grey Boat Code
 Submarine Assurance Framework

Location

Lloyd's Register's main office is located in London at 71 Fenchurch Street. Lloyd's Register also operates in more than 70 locations, serving clients based in 182 countries.

References

External links
 
 
 Lloyd's Register Foundation (LRF)
 IHS Markit - current publisher of Lloyd’s Register of Ships
 LRF - online Lloyd's Registers 1764-1960
 Mystic Seaport Museum - online American Lloyd's Registers 1859-1883
 

Business services companies established in 1760
Ship classification societies
Business services companies of the United Kingdom